Antoni Frąckiewicz (1765/1770–1845), was a Polish sculptor of the Baroque era, working in Małopolska in the early nineteenth century. His date of birth and death are unknown.

Frąckiewicz was referred to in the work of architect Baltazar Fontana. He executed sculptural decoration of the Norbertine Sisters church, and The Church of St. Peter and St. Paul in Imbramowice, Lesser Poland Voivodeship (1716-1722), which included: six altars and religious statues. He also decorated pulpits and altarpieces for churches in and around Kraków.

References
 Kornecki M., 1993: The Sacred Art: nature and culture in the landscape of the Jury. Publisher Management Team Jurassic Landscape Parks.
 Church of SS. Norbertine in Imbramowicach of the Apostles St. Peter and St. Paul. Published by the SS. Norbertine.

Polish Baroque sculptors
Polish male sculptors
19th-century Polish architects
1840s deaths
Year of birth unknown
Year of birth uncertain